Haplogroup C1 also known as C-F3393, is a major Y-chromosome haplogroup. It is one of two primary branches of the broader Haplogroup C, the other being C2 (also known as C-M217; the former Haplogroup C3).

The basal paragroup, C1* (C-F3393*), has not been found in samples from living or dead males.

Of the two primary branches, C1b is common in parts of Oceania and Asia. The other primary branch, C1a, is extremely rare worldwide and has been found mainly amongst individuals native to Japan or Europe and among Upper Paleolithic Europeans, with single cases known from Nepal and Jeju Island through academic studies and from an ethnic Armenian, an ethnic Kabyle, and an ethnic Han from Liaoning province of China through commercial testing.

Distribution

Subclades of C1 (C-F3393) are the predominant Y-DNA haplogroups among some Indigenous Australian peoples, some Pacific Islander peoples, and a few of the ethnic groups of the Lesser Sunda Islands of Indonesia. Other subclades are found, at very low frequencies, in isolated locations throughout the Eurasian landmass and adjoining islands.

C1a (CTS11043) 
 
Basal C1a* (CTS11043) was found in an Upper Paleolithic Europeans (Aurignacians), GoyetQ116-1 and Pestera Muerii2.

Among the most interesting findings of recent genetic research is that living members of C1a are also rare and distributed geographically in an extremely bifurcated pattern.
 
C1a1  or C-M8 is now found regularly only with low frequency (approximately 5% to 6% of all samples) in Japan.

C1a2 (known previously as C6) or  C-V20 now appears to be found only among European, Algerian, Turks, Armenian, and Nepali males.

C1a2 was present in the remains in Europe by the Upper Paleolithic, including the Vestonice cluster (Vestonice16) (i.e. remains found in the modern Czech Republic). It was also found in the 7,000-year-old (Mesolithic) remains of a WHG (Western Hunter-Gatherers) known as "La Braña 1", found in La Braña-Arintero, León, Spain. La Braña 1 was part of the so-called Villabruna cluster, named after a site in northeast Italy. By the time of the Villabruna cluster, however, the dominant Y-DNA haplogroup in Western Europe was I2. (And the balance was again altered by the mass migrations into Europe of Neolithic Middle Eastern farmer and Bronze Age Indo-Europeans.) further: a male from the Great Hungarian Plain, approximately contemporaneous to the La Braña man also carried it, as did the 30,000-year-old remains of a Vestonice Cluster hunter-gatherer from the Pavlov-Dolní Věstonice area (Czech Republic), as well as a 34,000 years old Russian hunter gatherers from Sungir (Sunghir 1/2/3/4).

C1b (F1370) 

Basal C1b* (F1370) has been identified in the remains of an individual known as Kostenki-14 who died circa 37,000 years BP (Upper Paleolithic) that was found at the Kostyonki archaeological site in western Russia. It has also been found in a small number of males from the Middle East.

C1b2 (C-B477) is the common ancestor of C-M38 and C-M347.

It is likely that more than 40% of Indigenous Australian males, before contact with European settlers, belonged to the subclade C1b2b (C-M347) known previously as  C4. Within C-M347 at least two subclades have been identified: C1b2b1 (DYS390.1del,M210) and an as yet unresolved offshoot of the C1b2b1 paragroup (i.e. M347xDYS390.1del,M210).

C1b2a (M38), previously known as C2, is virtually restricted to Island South East Asia, New Guinea, Melanesia, and Polynesia. Of its subclades, C1b2a1a (P33) is found at a high frequency among Polynesians.

Some members of populations in parts of Asia have been found to carry Y-DNA that belongs to haplogroup C1b1-AM00694/K281. C1b1b-B68 has been found in a Dusun in Brunei. C1b1a-B66/Z16458 has three primary subclades: C1b1a1-M356, C1b1a2-B65, and C1b1a3-Z16582. C1b1a3-Z16582 has been found in some individuals from Saudi Arabia and Iraq. C1b1a2-B65 comprises two subclades, C1b1a2a-B67 and C1b1a2b-F725. C1b1a2a-B67 has been found in two Lebbo' people in Borneo, Indonesia. C1b1a2b-F725 has been found in Han Chinese in China (Guangdong, Hunan, and Shaanxi), Dai people in Yunnan, Murut people in Brunei, Malay people in Singapore, and Aeta people in the Philippines. C1b1a1-M356 has been found with overall low frequency in South Asia, Central Asia, and Southwest Asia.

Phylogenetic structure 
C1 F3393
C1a CTS11043
C1a1 M8 Japan, China, South Korea, North Korea
C1a1a P121
C1a1a1  CTS9336
C1a1a1a   CTS6678 Japan, South Korea
C1a1a1b   Z1356 Japan
C1a1a2  Z45460 China (Liaoning)
C1a2 (previously C6) V20
C1a2a V182
C1a2a1 V222 United Kingdom, Italy (Calabria), Greece, Hungary, Ukraine
C-Y12152 Scotland
C-BY1117 Hungary, England
C-Y11695 Italy, Greece, Ukraine
C-BY67541 Italy, Germany
C1a2a2 Z29329 Spain, Poland
C1a2b Z38888/F16270/PH428 Lithuania, Ireland, England, Algeria, Armenians
C-Z44576 Algeria
C-Z44526/F15182 England, Armenian
C1b F1370
C1b1 K281
C1b1a B66/Z16458 
C1b1a1 (previously C5) M356 India, Sri Lanka, Bangladesh, Nepal, Pakistan, Afghanistan, Iran, United Arab Emirates, Kuwait, Saudi Arabia, China (Xinjiang & Shanxi), Myanmar, Thailand
C1b1a2 B65 Singapore, China (Yunnan, Guangdong, Hunan, Shaanxi), Borneo, the Philippines
C1b1a3 Z16582 Saudi Arabia, Iraq
C1b1b B68 Borneo
C1b2 B477/Z31885
C1b2a (previously C2) M38 
C1b2a1 M208
C1b2a1a P33 Polynesia
C1b2a1b P54
C1b2b (previously C4) M347 Australia
C1b2b1 M210

See also

Footnotes

C-F339